Clathrin, light chain B is a protein in humans that is encoded by the CLTB gene.

Clathrin is a large, soluble protein composed of heavy and light chains. It functions as the main structural component of the lattice-type cytoplasmic face of coated pits and coated vesicles which entrap specific macromolecules during receptor-mediated endocytosis. This gene encodes one of two clathrin light chain proteins which are believed to function as regulatory elements. Alternative splicing results in multiple transcript variants. [provided by RefSeq, Jul 2008].

References

Further reading 

Genes on human chromosome 5